German submarine U-744 was a type VIIC U-boat, launched on 11 March 1943, commanded by Oberleutnant zur See Heinz Blischke.

Design
German Type VIIC submarines were preceded by the shorter Type VIIB submarines. U-744 had a displacement of  when at the surface and  while submerged. She had two shafts and two  propellers.

U-744 was fitted with five  torpedo tubes (four fitted at the bow and one at the stern), fourteen torpedoes, one  SK C/35 naval gun, 220 rounds, and two twin  C/30 anti-aircraft guns. The boat had a complement of between forty-four and sixty.

Service history
She had two patrols, one from 2 December 1943 until 15 January 1944 and 24 February 1944 until 6 March 1944. She sank two ships in total,  on 3 January 1944, and the landing ship tank HMS LST-362 on 2 March 1944.

U-744 was forced to surface on 6 March 1944, after a 31-hour pursuit by British and Canadian ships. U-744 was then boarded by Allied sailors, who retrieved code books and other documents. Most of this was lost while being transferred between the U-Boat and the Allied ships. After attempts to tow the submarine into port failed, U-744 was scuttled by the allied warships.

Wolfpacks
U-744 took part in five wolfpacks, namely:
 Coronel 1 (15 – 17 December 1943)
 Sylt (18 – 23 December 1943)
 Rügen 2 (23 – 28 December 1943)
 Rügen 1 (28 December 1943 – 3 January 1944)
 Preussen (26 February – 6 March 1944)

Summary of raiding history

References

Notes

Citations

Bibliography

External links

German Type VIIC submarines
U-boats commissioned in 1943
U-boats sunk in 1944
U-boats sunk by British warships
U-boats sunk by Canadian warships
U-boats sunk by depth charges
World War II submarines of Germany
1943 ships
Ships built in Danzig
World War II shipwrecks in the Atlantic Ocean
Ships built by Schichau
Maritime incidents in March 1944